Beckbury is a civil parish in Shropshire, England.  It contains 17 listed buildings that are recorded in the National Heritage List for England.  Of these, one is listed at Grade II*, the middle of the three grades, and the others are at Grade II, the lowest grade.  The parish contains the village of Beckbury and the surrounding countryside.  Most of the listed buildings are in the village and consist of houses and associated structures.  Other listed buildings in the village are a church with items in the churchyard, a cock pit, a possible ice house, and a school.  Outside the village, the listed buildings are a farm building, a country house, cottages, and a structure hewn in rock underground, described as a grotto.


Key

Buildings

References

Citations

Sources

Lists of buildings and structures in Shropshire